Luis de la Fuente y Hoyos (January 17, 1914 – May 28, 1972), nicknamed "The Pirate", was a Mexican professional footballer, playing mostly on midfielder position. De la Fuente is considered one of the finest Mexican—and thus North American—midfielders of all time, being named to the IFFHS World Team for CONCACAF in 2021.

Early life
Born in Veracruz in 1914, de la Fuente was the first of four children of a father from Asturias and a mother from Santander Province, Spain. Shortly after he was born, de la Fuente's parents fled Veracruz after the United States seized the port city. The family would return to Veracruz but de la Fuente's father died when he was still young. His mother sent him to live with relatives in Santander for his primary education, but at age 10 he returned to his mother who sent him to study in Tacubaya, Mexico City where he would first play organized football.

The director of local side C.F. Aurrerá noticed de la Fuente's emerging football talent and eventually he dropped out of school to sign with the club.

Career
At the age of 15, De la Fuente made his competitive debut for Aurrerá in a 1929 cup match against Club Necaxa. He played for the club in the Primera Fuerza for two seasons, then joined Real Club España for the 1932–33 season. The following season, De la Fuente helped España win the championship.

De la Fuente's performances earned him a place on the Mexico national team at the 1934 FIFA World Cup qualification rounds. The team was eliminated after losing to the United States in the last round of qualifiers, after which it embarked on a European tour where de la Fuente started in a set of club friendlies. His performance with the national team attracted the interested of Spanish club Racing de Santander, who ended up signing him in 1934. After the Spanish Civil War broke out, he returned to Mexico to play for RC España and then Club América.

In 1939, the Paraguayan team Atlético Corrales embarked on a Latin American tour and visited Mexico with a squad composed of great players and, during their exhibition games in Mexico, they decided to sign De La Fuente. He played for Atlético Corrales for over a year and then signed for Vélez Sarsfield from Argentina before returning to Mexico to play for Marte.

Finally, in 1943, he signed with his native state team Tiburones Rojos of CD Veracruz. At CD Veracruz he was part of the team that won two Primera División de México championships in 1945 and 1949. De la Fuente was the first Mexico-born person to play in four countries (Mexico, Spain, Paraguay and Argentina).

De La Fuente retired on June 13, 1954.

Honours
Individual
IFFHS CONCACAF Men's Team of All Time: 2021

Personal life and death
De la Fuente died in 1972 of a heart attack and is buried in Veracruz, facing the Luis "Pirata" Fuente Stadium which carries his name.

References

External links
 
 More about "The Pirate"

1914 births
1972 deaths
Footballers from Veracruz
Association football midfielders
Mexican footballers
Mexico international footballers
Central American and Caribbean Games gold medalists for Mexico
Competitors at the 1938 Central American and Caribbean Games
Real Club España footballers
Racing de Santander players
Club América footballers
Club Atlético Vélez Sarsfield footballers
C.D. Veracruz footballers
La Liga players
Mexican expatriate footballers
Expatriate footballers in Spain
Expatriate footballers in Paraguay
Expatriate footballers in Argentina
Mexican expatriate sportspeople in Spain
Mexican expatriate sportspeople in Argentina
Central American and Caribbean Games medalists in football